The Frauen-Bundesliga 1997–98 was the 8th season of the Frauen-Bundesliga, Germany's premier football league. It began on 17 August 1997 and ended on 7 June 1998. It was the first season in which the Bundesliga used the modern system of one united league on the national level instead of a southern and northern division as in the years before.

Final standings

Results

Top scorers

References

1997-98
Ger
1
Women